John Massis (4 June 1940 – 12 July 1988) was a Flemish strongman and teeth-acrobat. His real name was Wilfried Morbée.

Massis specialized in bending iron with his teeth. He also performed stunts where he lifted cars, pulled trains and stopped motorbikes and even helicopters and hot air balloons with his teeth. This resulted in several entries in the Guinness World Records book. He even stopped 4 small sport planes of lifting off in 4 different directions.

In 1980 he started pirate radio "Radio Superstar" and also recorded the song John Massis de krachtpatser. In 1987 he recorded Zet er je tanden in, with Willy Sommers.

In 1983 he also funded a political party called Positief Radicalen in Dutch or Positive Radicals.

He had a few roles too in the Flemish films The Leeuw Van Vlaanderen (1984) and Merlina

In 2004 Johan Heldenbergh performed a play based on Massis' life: Massis, the musical.

In 2005 he became number 172 on the list of the most famous Belgian ever in history.

He was also a source of inspiration for the cartoonist Pirana in the 80's to draw "Het Land Zonder Tanden" (1986). They were also close personal friends.
He also made an appearance in the Kiekeboe-album De spray-historie (1988) with cartoon character  "John Massif".

In 1999  the band Noordkaap referred to John Massis by naming their album Massis.

Death
Because of his unknown and therefore untreated  diabetes condition Massis was found by the local police in a delirium. He was admitted to a psychiatric hospital. With waning media interest and diabetes undermining his condition, he committed suicide at the age of 48 officially on the 12th of July 1988. To make a statement he actually committed suicide on 11 July  which is the day of the Flemish Community. He was found only the day after by his sisters Godelieve and Erna Morbée.

External links

1940 births
1988 deaths
1988 suicides
Belgian stunt performers
People associated with physical culture
Entertainers from Bruges